Pandya Store is an Indian Hindi-language soap opera television series that premiered on 25 January 2021 on Star Plus. It streams digitally on Disney+ Hotstar. Produced by Sunjoy Waddhwa and Commal Waddhwa under their banner Sphere Origins, the series is an official adaptation of Star Vijay's Tamil series Pandian Stores. It stars Kinshuk Mahajan, Shiny Doshi, Akshay Kharodia, Kanwar Dhillon, Mohit Parmar, Simran Budharup,  Alice Kaushik and Krutika Desai Khan.

Premise 
Gautam and Dhara Pandya, a middle-class married couple, manage the Pandya Store. Apart from their business, Dhara also looks after Gautam's three younger siblings, Dev, Shiva and Krish. While Shiva is married to Raavi, Dev is married to Rishita. It follows Dhara's struggles to bind the family together despite the problems.

Plot

Cast

Main 
 Kinshuk Mahajan as Gautam "Gomby" Pandya – Suman and Darshan's eldest son; Dev, Shiva and Krish's brother; Dhara's husband; Anita's ex-fiancé; Yashodhan's adoptive father. (2021–present)
 Shiny Doshi as Dhara Patel Pandya – Hardik's sister; Gautam's wife; Yashodhan's adoptive mother. (2021–present)
 Akshay Kharodia as Dev Pandya – Suman and Darshan's second son; Gautam, Shiva and Krish's brother; Rishita's husband; Sanchi and Shesh's father. (2021–present)
 Jovian Fernandes as Child Dev Pandya (2021)
 Kanwar Dhillon as Shiva Pandya – Suman and Darshan's third son; Gautam, Dev, and Krish's brother; Raavi's husband; Mithu's father. (2021–present)
 Harminder Singh as Child Shiva Pandya (2021)
 Mohit Parmar as Krish Pandya – Suman and Darshan's youngest son; Gautam, Dev, and Shiva's brother; Shweta's husband; Kirti's former love interest (2021–present)
 Swarnim Neema as Child Krish Pandya (2021)
 Simran Budharup as Rishita Dwivedi Pandya – Kalyani and Janardhan's elder daughter; Kirti's sister; Dev's wife; Sanchi and Shesh's mother. (2021–present)
 Alice Kaushik as Raavi Narang Pandya – Urmila's daughter; Prafulla's niece and adopted daughter; Anita's cousin; Shiva's wife; Mithu's mother. (2021–present)
 Jini Khan as Child Raavi Narang (2021)
 Krutika Desai Khan as Suman Narayan Pandya – Jagat's sister; Darshan's widow; Gautam, Dev, Shiva and Krish's mother; Sanchi, Shesh and Mithu's grandmother; Yashodhan's adoptive grandmother. (2021–present)

Recurring 
 Ankita Bahuguna as Shweta Patel Pandya – Harikishan and Jhankana's daughter; Deven's former love interest; Krish's wife; Yashodhan's mother. (2022–present)
 Pallavi Rao as Prafulla Narang Narayan – Jignesh and Urmila's sister; Jagat's wife; Shubham's mother; Raavi's aunt and adoptive mother. (2021–2022)
 Shrasti Maheshwari as Anita Narang – Jignesh's daughter; Prafulla's niece; Raavi and Shubham's cousin; Gautam's ex-fiancée (2021–present)
 Devishi Madan as Kirti Dwivedi – Kalyani and Janardhan's younger daughter; Rishita's sister; Krish's former love interest (2021–present)
 Vijay Badlani as Janardhan Dwivedi – Kamini's brother; Kalyani's husband; Rishita and Kirti's father; Sanchi and Shesh's grandfather. (2021–present)
 Geetika Shyam as Kalyani Dwivedi – Janardhan's wife; Rishita and Kirti's mother; Sanchi and Shesh's grandmother. (2021–present)
 Vandana Vithlani as Kamini Dwivedi Choudhry – Janardhan's sister; Somendra's wife; Rishita and Kirti's aunt (2021–present)
 Shyaam Makhecha as Hardik Patel – Dhara's brother; Gautam's friend (2021–present)
 Krunal Pandit as Jagat Narayan – Suman's brother; Prafulla's husband; Shubham's father (2021–2022)
 Renu Pandey as Kanta Joshi – Suman's best friend (2021–present)
 Vidhaan Sharma as Yashodhan "Chiku" Pandya – Shweta and Deven's son; Dhara and Gautam's adoptive son (2023–present)
 Azan as Baby Yashodhan "Chiku" Pandya (2022–2023)
 Kiara Sadh as Sanchi "Chutki" Pandya – Rishita and Dev's daughter; Shesh's sister (2023–present)
 Raanav Sharma as Shesh Pandya – Rishita and Dev's son; Sanchi's brother (2023–present)
 Ronav Vaswani as Mithu Pandya – Raavi and Shiva's son (2023–present)
 Farrukh Saeed as Darshan Pandya – Suman's late husband; Gautam, Dev, Shiva and Krish's father; Sanchi, Shesh and Mithu's grandfather; Yashodhan's adoptive grandfather. (2021)
 Mohit Sharma as Jignesh Narang – Prafulla and Urmila's brother; Anita's father; Raavi and Shubham's uncle (2021)
 Ankita Sood as Disha – Shiva's former prospective bride (2021)
 Jinal Jain as Sneha Mittal – Raavi's friend (2021)
 Harttaj Gill as Arnav – Raavi's helper, friend and former boss (2022–present)
 Rajani Gupta as Jhankana Patel - Harikishan's wife; Shweta's mother; Yashodhan's grandmother (2022–present)
 Sanjeev Sharma as Harikishan "Hari" Patel - Jhankana's husband; Shweta's father; Yashodhan's grandfather (2022)
 Amitesh Prasad replaced Sharma as Harikishan Patel (2022–present)
 Nitin Sharma as Deven - Shweta's former love interest; Yashodhan's father (2022)
 Riddhi Singh as Forum - Shweta's friend (2022)

Special appearances 
 Hina Khan as Akshara Singhania from Yeh Rishta Kya Kehlata Hai to promote the generation leap (2021)
 Ragini Khanna as Suhana Kashyap from Sasural Genda Phool to promote the generation leap (2021)
 Neelu Vaghela as Santosh Rathi from Diya Aur Baati Hum to promote the generation leap (2021)
 Ulka Gupta as Banni Chow to promote Banni Chow Home Delivery (2022)
 Celesti Bairagey as Rajjo Dhaki to promote Rajjo (2022)

Production

Development 
In January 2020, Star Plus planned an official Hindi remake of Star Vijay's Tamil series Pandian Stores to be produced by Mahesh Pandey Productions under the title Khandaan. With a change in title to Hum– Ek Makaan Ek Dukaan, filming began in February 2020 with portions shot in Varanasi, but shooting was halted in March 2020 due to the coronavirus pandemic.

After the lockdown, the series was shifted to Star Bharat. The channel changed its programming genre to comedy from drama due to which it was scrapped and the plot was changed completely to suit it. Later, filming began in July 2020 post-COVID break and the show was aired with the title Gupta Brothers - Chaar Kunware From Ganga Kinaare from 5 October 2020, as a dramedy series to suit Star Bharat's comedy genre.

In December 2020, Star Plus announced another Hindi television remake of Pandian Stores titled Pandya Store produced by Sphere Origins which premiered on 25 January 2021. With the launch of the second official Hindi television remake of Pandian Stores; the first official Hindi television remake Gupta Brothers was announced to go off-air on 5 February. But, later, Gupta Brothers went off-air abruptly on 26 January, earlier than the announced date.

Deven Bhojani was hired as the creative consultant for Pandya Store in January 2021. On his part, Bhojani said, "I feel privileged to be working with this wonderful team as a Creative Consultant. Brainstorming sessions with the team and the channel about various aspects with regard to the show have been quite fun. Workshops with the actors have also been pretty rigorous and rewarding. They certainly are one hardworking bunch and as a team, we are delighted to bring forth 'Pandya Store' to the audience."

In March 2021, the show took a generation leap of ten years and the characters of Dev, Shiva, Krish and Raavi were grown up. The first post-leap episode was telecast on 5 March 2021.

In mid 2022, there were various reports of the show going off-air or going through a leap. However, soon the ratings rose and all the reports were denied by the cast.

During Shiva's death sequence, Kanwar Dhillon, who portrays Shiva, disguised himself as six characters, including a transgender. Alice Kaushik, who portrays Raavi, was dressed as a ghost resembling Vidya Balan's Manjulika from Bhool Bhulaiyaa during the same track.

Casting 

Kinshuk Mahajan was cast to portray Gautam Pandya opposite Doshi. On preparing for which Mahajan said, "To fit into the skin of my character I had to lose about 5kgs and had a grueling diet. Also since this show is based in Somnath, Gujarat, I had to work on my dialect, luckily Shiny, my co-actor was my guide. Above all, shooting in Somnath and Bikaner was a blessing." Shiny Doshi was cast to portray Dhara Patel, opposite Mahajan. Doshi said, "I play a strong and positive character. I somehow relate to my character, Dhara. I am a gujarati, even then it was necessary to work towards certain nuances to meet the requirements of my character. We also attended workshops before we began shooting for the show."

Kanwar Dhillon was cast as the elder version of Shiva Pandya, which was previously portrayed by Harminder Singh. He was cast opposite Kaushik. Dhillon said, "Shiva is a very much regular guy who is fun-loving and emotional. He has a different layering with each character in the show and can't be the same with everyone. I have done a few workshops and hopefully, people will like my character." Alice Kaushik was cast as the elder version of Raavi Narang, opposite Dhillon. The role was previously portrayed by Jini Khan. Kaushik said, "I relate to this quality of Raavi a lot. She is almost always high on energy, she loves to keep her close ones happy. She is a ball of happiness, she is a magic wanting to explode. It's interesting that the whole of Raavi is a part of me."

Akshay Kharodia was cast as the elder versions of Dev Pandya, previously played by Jovian Fernandes, opposite Budharup. It marks his TV debut. Kharodia said, "I relate to Dev because I also come from a joint family and like Dev, I too keep family values as my priority." Simran Budharup was cast to portray Rishita Dwivedi opposite Kharodia. Budharup said, "I like the way Rishita is, she's blunt, outspoken and practical. I agree she's sometimes very rude, but that's fine." Mohit Parmar was cast as the elder versions of Krish Pandya, previously played by Swarnim Neema. It marks his acting debut, Parmar said, "Krish has taught me a lot as an actor, the experience is overwhelming and I have learned a lot." Krutika Desai Khan and Farrukh Saeed were cast to portray Pandya parents, Suman and Darshan Pandya. 

Pallavi Rao and Shrasti Maheshwari were cast as Pandya's and Raavi's relatives Prafulla Narayan and Anita Narang. Shyaam Makhecha was cast as Dhara's brother, Hardik Patel. Krunal Pandit and Mohit Sharma were cast as Pandya's relatives Jagat Narayan and Jignesh Narang. Vandana Vithlani, Vijay Badlani and Geetika Shyam were cast to play Rishita's family members, Kamini Choudhry, Janardhan and Kalyani Dwivedi. Devishi Madan was cast as Rishita's sister, Kirti Dwivedi opposite Parmar. Renu Pandey was cast as Suman's friend, Kanta Joshi. Ankita Sood played the role of Disha, opposite Dhillon and Jinal Jain played Raavi's friend Sneha Mittal.

In July 2022, Ankita Bahuguna was cast as Shweta Patel, opposite Parmar. Rajani Gupta and Sanjeev Sharma joined the show as Shweta's parents. In September 2022, Harttaj Gill was cast as Raavi's friend, Arnav, Riddhi Singh as Shweta's friend Forum and Nitin Sharma was cast as Deven, opposite Bahuguna. In November 2022, Amitesh Prasad replaced Sanjeev Sharma as Shweta's father.

In February 2022, Akshay Kharodia who portrays Dev, quit the show as he wanted to focus on his family. He later changed his decision and resumed shooting in May 2022. Akshay said, 

Simran Budhraup received death and rape threats after her character, Rishita, turned negative in 2022. The actress revealed that she filed an FIR against the harassers. Budhraup said, "A group of young boys and girls would abuse and give rape threats. I initially ignored the threats as the character was bound to get disliked. But it went haywire when people started abusing, that's when I took a step and I went to the police station and lodged a complaint."

In September 2022, Pallavi Rao, who portrayed Prafulla, quit the show, due to her dates not being used and her diminished screen time. She said,

Filming 

The series is set in Somnath, Gujarat. It is mainly shot at the Film City, Mumbai. Some initial sequences were shot in Somnath and at the Somnath Temple, Veraval. The team also shot some sequences in Bikaner including scenes at Junagarh Fort.

On 20 February 2021, a fire broke out on the set of the show. Some costumes and shoot material was burnt, while there was no loss of life at the set's fire.

On 13 April 2021, Uddhav Thackeray, Chief Minister of Maharashtra announced a sudden curfew due to increased Covid cases, while the production halted in Mumbai from 14 April 2021.

The production location was soon shifted temporarily to Bikaner. The team shot at the Gajner Palace, during the lockdown and shoot halt in Mumbai. After two months of shooting in Bikaner, the team shifted back to Film City, Mumbai in June 2021. 

In January 2022, Alice Kaushik, Akshay Kharodia, Simran Budharup and Mohit Parmar tested positive for COVID-19. Shooting of the show was stalled for sanitization. The storyline was revised accordingly, a pre-leap track was introduced with Harminder Singh, Jini Khan, Jovian Fernandes and Swarnim Neema returning to the cast.

Release 
The first promo of the show featured Kinshuk Mahajan and Shiny Doshi with the children. It was released by Star Plus and Disney+Hotstar on 8 January 2021.

In March 2021, a generation-leap promo was released, featuring Hina Khan, Ragini Khanna and Neelu Vaghela. They reprised their characters from Yeh Rishta Kya Kehlata Hai, Sasural Genda Phool and Diya Aur Baati Hum respectively.

Broadcast 
Pandya Store premiered on 25 January 2021 on Star Plus, replacing Lockdown Ki Love Story. It airs in United Kingdom on Utsav Plus with English subtitles since its premiere. 

From 21 April 2021, it replaced Shaadi Mubarak, which went off air abruptly due to COVID-19. Since 2 October 2022, Pandya Store is broadcast daily along with other Star Plus's shows.

Television specials

Pyar Ka Pehla Nasha (2021) 
A special segment named Pyar Ka Pehla Nasha was aired on Star Plus on 19 December 2021. The segment was hosted by Raavi and Shiva. It featured the top ten romantic moments of the year 2021, starring couples of Star Plus's shows.

Ravivaar With Star Parivaar (2022) 

The cast of Pandya Store participated as a team in the musical game show Ravivaar With Star Parivaar. The team competed with the teams of other Star Plus's shows. Pandya Store emerged as the third runner-up of the show.

Reception

Critical reception 
Pandya Store generally received positive reviews from the critics. Despite being a remake, the series has managed to bring freshness with its relatable story and performances. It is among the most watched Hindi GEC show.

Adaptations 
Pandya Store is an official adaptation of the Tamil series Pandian Stores. The show has previously been remade in Hindi as Gupta Brothers, that premiered on Star Bharat from 5 October 2020. The series went off-air the day after Pandya Store premiered on 25 January 2021.

Soundtrack 

Pandya Store's soundtrack is composed by Nakash Aziz and Sargam Jassu. The first song "Yaadon Ki Baarat", is an original track but its name is inspired from the 1973 film Yaadon Ki Baaraat'''s title song. It is the theme song of the show and is sung by Nakash Aziz. The female version of the song is sung by Pamela Jain.

The second song "Ishq Ye Haaye Re" is an original track. It is the theme song of Gautam and Dhara. It is sung by Nakash Aziz. The third song "Rait Zara Si" from Atrangi Re'', not an original track, is the theme song of Shiva and Raavi. It is sung by Arijit Singh and Shashaa Tirupati.

Awards and nominations

See also 
 List of programs broadcast by Star Plus

References

External links 
 
 Pandya Store on Disney+ Hotstar

2021 Indian television series debuts
StarPlus original programming
Hindi-language television shows
Indian television soap operas
Television shows set in Gujarat
Hindi-language television series based on Tamil-language television series